The Kalhora dynasty was a Muslim dynasty based in the region of Sindh, present day's Pakistan. The dynasty ruled Sindh and parts of the Punjab region between 1701 and 1783 from their capital of Khudabad, before shifting to  Hyderabad from 1768 onwards. They were assigned to hold authority by the Mughal Grand Vizier Mirza Ghazi Beg and later formed their own independent dynasty, and they were known as the "Kalhora Nawabs" by the Mughal emperors.

Kalhora rule of Sindh began in 1701 when Mian Yar Muhammad Kalhoro was invested with title of Khuda Yar Khan and was made governor of Upper Sindh sarkar by royal decree of the Mughals. Later, he was made governor of Siwi through imperial decree. He founded a new city Khudabad after he obtained from Aurangzeb a grant of the track between the Indus and the Nara and made it the capital of his kingdom. Thenceforth, Mian Yar Muhammad became one of the imperial agents or governors. Later he extended his rule to Sehwan and Bukkur and became sole ruler of Northern and central Sindh except Thatto which was still under the administrative control of Mughal Empire.

The Kalhora dynasty succumbed to the Qizilbash during the invasion of Nadir Shah. Mian Ghulam Shah Kalhoro reorganised and consolidated his power, but his son lost control of Sindh and was overthrown by Talpurs Amirs. Mian Abdul Nabi Kalhoro was the last Kalhora ruler.

Origins
Kalhoras claimed an Arab ancestry of Abbasid origin.

According to some sources, the Kalhoras were from the native Sindhi Channa tribe, which is either a sub-division of either Jats or on par with Jats as mentioned in the Muslim sources.

Military 

As has been already stated the Kalhora army consisted of a large number of Baloch tribes. The Balochis had by this time become the strongest military force in the land. The early Kalhora had encouraged the Balochis to settle in Sind, in order that the Kalhoro might take advantage of this military superiority in the battlefield. The whole army of Kalhoras consisted of Balochis. After the successful revolt of the army the Talpur - Mirs became rulers of Sindh, the Kalhoras were completely wiped out.

Rulers

See also
 List of Monarchs of Sindh

External links

|-

|-

References

History of Sindh
Kalhora dynasty
Sindhi tribes
1701 establishments in Asia
Arab dynasties
Abbasids